Sphenomorphus pratti is a species of skink, a lizard in the family Scincidae. The species is endemic to Papua New Guinea.

Geographic range
S. pratti is found throughout Papua New Guinea except in savanna areas in the south. It is also found on the islands of New Britain, New Hanover Island, and Manus Island.

Habitat
The preferred habitat of S. pratti is forest.

Etymology
The specific name, pratti, is in honor of British naturalist Antwerp Edgar Pratt who collected the type specimen.

References

Further reading
Boulenger, G.A. (1903). "Description of new Reptiles from British New Guinea". Proc. Zool. Soc. London 1903 (2): 125-129 + Plates XII-XIII. (Lygosoma pratti, new species, p. 128 + Plate XIII, figures 1-1a).
Mys, Benoit (1988). "The zoogeography of the scincid lizards of North Papua New Guinea (Reptilia: Scincidae). I. The distribution of the species". Bull. Inst. Roy. Sci. Nat. Belgique (Biologie) 58: 127–183. (Sphenomorphus pratti, new combination, p. 145).

pratti
Reptiles of Papua New Guinea
Endemic fauna of Papua New Guinea
Reptiles described in 1903
Taxa named by George Albert Boulenger
Skinks of New Guinea